KIPI (93.5 FM) is a radio station licensed to serve the community of Eagle Butte, South Dakota. The station is owned by the Cheyenne River Sioux Tribe and airs a variety radio format.

The station was assigned the KIPI call letters by the Federal Communications Commission on December 8, 2017.

References

External links
 Official Website
 

IPI (FM)
Radio stations established in 2018
2018 establishments in South Dakota
Variety radio stations in the United States
Dewey County, South Dakota
Ziebach County, South Dakota
Native American radio